Chelmsford Rugby Football Club is a rugby union team based in Chelmsford, Essex that currently play in London 3 Essex - a league at tier 8 of the English rugby union system - following their relegation from London 2 North East at the end of the 2017–18 season.

History/Background

Chelmsford RFC were founded in 1920. At present, there are around 620 members and the club fields up to fourth senior teams each week. Chelmsford currently play in London 2 North East. In addition to the senior teams, there are 300 Mini/Youth members providing teams from under 6's to under 17's. The team play at Coronation Park in Timpsons Lane, Springfield, Chelmsford where they have played for more than 40 years.

Club Honours
Eastern Counties 2 champions: 1989–90
Eastern Counties 1 champions: 1990–91
London 2 North East champions (2): 1998–99, 2014–15
London 3 Essex Champions 2019–20

See also
 Essex RFU

External links
Chelmsford R.F.C's website
Rugby clubs at Chelmsford Borough Council

Sport in Chelmsford
English rugby union teams
Rugby union clubs in Essex
Rugby clubs established in 1920